São Lourenço (Saint Lawrence) is a Brazilian municipality and spa town in the southern part of the state of Minas Gerais, in the Southeast of the country. It is one of the smallest Brazilian municipalities, with only 57.2 km² (22.1 sq. mi), and is located at an equal distance - approximately 3.5h - from two major cities, São Paulo and Rio de Janeiro.

São Lourenço has a yearly mean temperature of 18 °C. In the winter the lows can reach 0 °C, sometimes with heavy frost.

The region has occasionally been affected by flooding; the most severe occurred in 1940, 1986, 1990 and 2000. In January 2000, heavy storms caused the waters of Rio Verde to rise more than 4.5m, leaving parts of the city underwater, including the city centre and the municipal park where the mineral water fountains are located.

Tourism is the main economic activity of the city although it has also become the regional hub for shopping, medical care, and banking. The city is served by Comte. Luiz Carlos de Oliveira Airport.

Throughout the year, several events take place in Sao Lourenço. They include the International Choir Festival, Cachaça Festival -  cachaça is a hard liquor distilled from sugar cane juice, Winter Festival, Street Carnaval, Orchid Exhibits, Megacycle (a motorcyclists gathering), Vintage/Classic Cars Expo, a Hot Air Balloonists gathering, as well as several conferences of large Brazilian organizations.

In the beginning of August, the city celebrates its patron saint, Saint Lawrence, with a ten-day festival that includes live music, traditional food, and fireworks.

References

External links
 

Municipalities in Minas Gerais
Springs of Brazil